ULV may refer to:

Places
 Universidad Linda Vista, a university in Mexico
 University of La Verne, a university in California, U.S.
 Ulverston railway station (station code ULV), on the Furness Line in Cumbria, England

Technology
 Unified Launch Vehicle, an Indian rocket family under development
 Ultra-low-voltage processor, a class of CPU targeting lower power consumption
 Ultra-low volume, spraying of pesticides